The Baltimore Nighthawks are a women's American football team in the Women's Football Alliance. The Nighthawks played their inaugural game in Brooklandville at Martin D. Tullai Field (adjacent to St. Paul's School).  The Nighthawks played the remainder of their home season at the Baltimore Lutheran School in Towson.

The Baltimore Nighthawks support several charitable organizations including Healthcare for the Homeless, Special Olympics MD through the annual Polar Bear Plunge, various breast cancer groups, and the Central MD Girl Scouts.  On March 21, 2009, the Nighthawks made women's football history when they hosted the first Pink Ribbon Bowl.  The goal was to raise awareness about breast cancer and introduce professional women's tackle football to a broader audience.  A portion of the proceeds benefited the Susan G. Komen for the Cure foundation for breast cancer research.  The Baltimore Nighthawks have supported Healthcare for the Homeless since 2009 by volunteering for the Chocolate Affair.

Season-by-season

|-
|2008 || 2 || 6 || 0 || 5th Eastern North Atlantic || --
|-
|2009 || 3 || 5 || 0 || 4th Eastern Mid-Atlantic || --
|-
|2010 || 3 || 5 || 0 || 4th Eastern Southeast || --
|-
|2011 || 3 || 4 || 1 || 2nd Eastern Mid-Atlantic || Lost Founders Bowl Tournament Quarterfinal (New England)
|-
|2012 || 7 || 2 || 0 || 1st Eastern Mid-Atlantic || Lost Eastern Conference Semifinal (Montreal)
|-
|2013 || 0 || 7 || 0 || 4th Eastern Mid-Atlantic || --
|-
|2014 || 4 || 5 || 0 || 3rd Eastern Mid-Atlantic || Lost Founders Bowl (Madison)
|-
|2015 || 3 || 4 || 0 || 3rd Eastern Mid-Atlantic || --
|-
|2016 || 3 || 5 || 0 || 6th Eastern Atlantic || --
|-
|2017 || 4 || 4 || 0 || 9th WFA II National Rankings || --
|-
|2018 || 4 || 4 || 0 ||  WFA II National Rankings || --
|-
|2019 || 4 || 4 || 0 ||  WFA II National Rankings || --
|-
|2021 || 4 || 3 || 0 || || --
|-
|2022 || 4 || 4 || 0 || 2nd WFA II National Rankings || Lost Eastern Conference Finals (Derby City Dynamite)
|-
!Totals || 48 || 62 || 1 ||  ||

Season schedules

2009

2010

2014

2018

2019

2020

2021

2022

2023

Source:

Roster

References

External links
Baltimore Nighthawks website

Sports in Baltimore County, Maryland
American football teams in Baltimore
American football teams established in 2008
2008 establishments in Maryland